Ruslan Richardovych Dedukh (born 13 April 1998) is a Ukrainian footballer who plays as a midfielder.

Career

Yunist Chernihiv and Vorskla Poltava U-19
Born in Chernihiv, Dedukh started to play for the youth team of Yunist Chernihiv, then he moved Vorskla Poltava U-19 in the 2015–16 season, where he played 19 matches and he scored two goals during the match against FC Karpaty Lviv U-19.

FC Kalush
In 2018 Dedukh started to play for FC Kalush a team from Kalush, Ivano-Frankivsk Oblast. and in the season 2019–20 with the team he got second and was promoted to Ukrainian First League.

FC Chernihiv 
In summer 2020, Dedukh moved to FC Chernihiv in the Ukrainian Second League. On 24 October, he made his debut with his new team against FC Uzhhorod in  the season 2020–21 Ukrainian Second League season.

Hirnyk-Sport Horishni Plavni
In January 2021, he signed with Hirnyk-Sport Horishni Plavni in the Ukrainian First League, making his debut against Prykarpattia Ivano-Frankivsk on 12 March.

Nyva Ternopil
In summer 2021, he moved to Nyva Ternopil of the Ukrainian First League. On 25 July he made his debut against Polissya Zhytomyr. On 27 November, he scored his first league goal against Kramatorsk. In December 2022 his contract was terminated with mutual consent. In February 2023, Livyi Bereh Kyiv showed interest to the player.

Career statistics

Club

Honours
Nyva Ternopil
 Ukrainian Second League: 2019–20

FC Chernihiv.
 Chernihiv Oblast Football Championship: 2018

References

External links
 
 
 
 

1998 births
Living people
Ukrainian footballers
Footballers from Chernihiv
Association football midfielders
FC Yunist Chernihiv players
FC Lviv players
FC Chernihiv players
FC Kalush players
FC Hirnyk-Sport Horishni Plavni players
FC Nyva Ternopil players
Ukrainian First League players
Ukrainian Second League players